This is a recap of the 1961 season for the Professional Bowlers Association (PBA) Tour.  It was the tour's third season. It consisted of 13 events, seven of which were won by Dick Weber. One of the tournaments not won by Weber was the PBA National Championship, which went to Dave Soutar.

Tournament schedule

External links
1961 Season Schedule

Professional Bowlers Association seasons
1961 in bowling